The Georgian graffiti of Nazareth and Sinai are the Old Georgian pilgrim graffiti inscriptions written in ancient Georgian Asomtavruli script found in Nazareth and Mount Sinai. The excavations were carried out under the guidance of the Italian archaeologist and Franciscan priest Bellarmino Bagatti from 1955 to 1960. Georgian pilgrimage towards the Holy Land started from the 5th century, reaching even the most distant 
sanctuaries.

Graffiti

Nazareth graffiti
The Georgian graffiti from Nazareth are poorly preserved and fragmentary in nature. Of the four inscriptions, only one can be deciphered as a complete sentence composed of the four abbreviated words:

ႥႪႤႪႨ
Translation: "Apostle Paul" 

Ⴀ
Translation: "A" 

Ⴉ
Translation: "K" 

ႸႤ ႨႳ ႵႤ ႢႨ
Translation: "Jesus Christ, have mercy on Giorgi".

Sinai graffiti
In Sinai total number of twelve Georgian inscriptions were discovered. They were left 
by pilgrims on their way to the sanctuaries of Sinai or on the way back. Georgian Sinaitic graffiti inscriptions were discovered in the Wadi Mukattab and Wadi Haggag areas, both major routes of pilgrim-traffic in the Byzantine and Early Islamic period. Most of these Georgian inscriptions are carved out in relatively low, easily accessible places. The letters are usually small, their size not exceeding few centimeters, even the biggest of the inscriptions with its 12 cm high letters is not of monumental character.

ႵႤ ႦႭႱႨႫႤ ႸႤ
Translation: "Jesus Christ, have mercy on Zosime".

ႵႤ ႸႪႤ ႫႬჂ
Translation: "Jesus Christ, have mercy on your monk".

ႼႭ ႱႨႬႠ ႸႤ ႫႤ ႼႭ
Translation: "Holy Sinai, have mercy on me, o holy".

ႣႤ ႠႫ
Translation: "Greatness, Amen”.

ႭႭ ႸႤ ႫႨႱႵႨႸႤ ႾႪႬႨႢႡႪ
Translation: "O, Lord, have mercy on Miski, have mercy on the fruit(?) of Gabriel".

ႤႣ ႢႥ
Translation: "For prayer" (?)

ႢႰႨႢႭႪ
Translation: "Grigol"

Dating
The Georgian graffiti were found incised, together with the Greek, Syriac, Latin and Armenian letters, on plaster in the remains of an ancient shrine discovered under the mosaic pavements of a ruined Byzantine church and dated by Joan E. Taylor to the period between 340 and 427. The Georgian finds were studied and published by the Georgian historian and linguist Zaza Aleksidze. All these artifacts are preserved at the Franciscan Museum near the Greek Orthodox Church of the Annunciation. 

Together with the Georgian Bir el Qutt inscriptions found in Judaean Desert, the graffiti inscriptions are the oldest extant Georgian inscriptions. They illustrate the early pilgrimage of Georgian Christians to the Holy Land shortly after Christianization of Iberia. Further, Werner Seibt suggests that the Georgian script could have been invented in Syro-Palestine by the expatriate Georgian monks. They might have been supported in their endeavor by their high-ranking aristocratic countrymen such as Bacurius the Iberian, a Byzantine commander in Palestine.

See also
Bolnisi inscriptions
Umm Leisun inscription
Epitaph of Samuel

References

Bibliography 
Codoñer, J. S. (2014) New Alphabets For the Christian Nations: Frontier strategies in the Byzantine commonwealth between the 4th and 10th centuries, University of Valladolid, 
Tchekhanovets, Y. (2018) The Caucasian Archaeology of the Holy Land: Armenian, Georgian and Albanian Communities between the Fourth and Eleventh Centuries CE, Brill, Leiden/Boston,  
Tchekhanovets, Y. (2011) Early Georgian Pilgrimage to the Holy Land, Liber Annuus 61
Khurtsilava, B. (2018) Traces of the Georgians on the Holy Land, Tbilisi, 

Georgian inscriptions
5th-century inscriptions
5th century in the Byzantine Empire
1950s archaeological discoveries
Graffiti (archaeology)
Nazareth
Mount Sinai